The Battle of Mullihambato was fought in present-day Ecuador during the Inca Civil War, with Atahualpa halting or possibly defeating the forces of Atoc after having previously been defeated in the battle of Chillopampa Plains. Atahualpa's forces led a counter-attack and soon faced the Huáscarans at Chimborazo, routing them and forcing the southern armies out of the north. The war did however not come to an end until the Battle of Quipaipan.

Mullihambato
Mullihambato
1531 in South America
History of Ecuador
1530s in the Inca civilization